Alexander Calder (1898–1976) was an American sculptor and inventor of the mobile sculpture.

Alexander Calder may also refer to:

Alexander Milne Calder (1846–1923), American sculptor, father of Alexander Stirling Calder
Alexander Stirling Calder (1870–1945), American sculptor, father of Alexander Calder
Alexander Calder (mayor) (1806–1853), first mayor of Beaumont, Texas